Succasunna-Kenvil is a former census-designated place (CDP) located within Roxbury Township, in Morris County, New Jersey, United States. As of the 2000 United States Census, the CDP's population was 12,569. For the 2010 Census, the area was split into two CDPs, Succasunna (with a 2010 census population of 9,152) and Kenvil (3,009 as of 2010).

Geography
According to the US Census Bureau, the CDP had a total area of 17.6 km2 (6.8 mi2). 17.3 km2 (6.7 mi2) of land and 0.3 km2 (0.1 mi2) of water (1.77%).

Demographics

The 2000 United States Census counted 12,569 people, 4,138 households, and 3,475 families residing in the CDP. The population density was 727.6/km2 (1,884.3/mi2). The total of 4,184 housing units had a density of 242.2/km2 (627.3/mi2). The racial makeup of the CDP was 92.99% White, 1.34% Black or African American, 0.1% Native American, 4.11% Asian, 0.0% Pacific Islander, 0.67% from other races, and 0.81% from two or more races. 3.87% of the population were Hispanic or Latino of any race.

Out of the 4,138 households, 43.6% had children under the age of 18 living with them, 74.5% were married couples living together, 6.9% had a female householder with no husband present, and 16.0% were non-families. 13.3% of all households were individual persons and 5.4% had someone living alone of the age of 65 years or older. The average household size was 3.02 and the average family size was 3.33.

In the CDP the population was spread out, with 28.4% under the age of 18, 5.8% from 18 to 24, 30.1% from 25 to 44, 26.0% from 45 to 64, and 9.6% who were 65 years of age or older. The median age was 38 years. For every 100 females, there were 97.9 males. For every 100 females age 18 and over, there were 93.4 males.

The median income for a household in the CDP was $83,614, and the median income for a family was $90,015. Males had a median income of $64,188 versus $37,841 for females. The per capita income for the CDP was $31,923. About 1.9% of families and 2.4% of the population were below the poverty line, including 2.4% of those under age 18 and 1.9% of those age 65 or over.

References

Census-designated places in Morris County, New Jersey
Roxbury Township, New Jersey